Bhukha is a 1989 Indian Sambalpuri-language film directed by Sabyasachi Mohapatra. The movie was produced by Mohapatra under the banner of Kumar Productions and had music by Ramesh Kumar Mahananda. This movie is based on the Sambalpuri play Bhukha written by Manglu Charan Biswal. It was the first film from Odisha to get an International Jury Award at the Gijón International Film Festival.

Synopsis
This film portrays the plight of the "Bajnias" or "Ganda" tribe of Odisha who are traditionally drummers by profession and the negative impact of cultural dominance by dominant class of people.

Cast
 Sarat Pujari
 Sadhu Meher
 Bijaya Pujari
 Swati Roy
 Chitta Pattnaik
 Mantu Mahapatra
 Narahari Patel
 Jagadananda Chhuria 
 Netrananda Barik

Songs
 Aarati Taarini Go Asta Udaya Arate Je Chinte
 Malli Phuti Mahakila Ranga Rasiaa Ke
 Phatai Khaili Bella Kukila Re
 Subha Lagane Bara Kale Gamana Ho

Awards and nominations
 International Jury Award at Gijon International Film Festival, Spain, 1990.
 Selected for World Rural Film Festival, Aurrilac, France.

See also
 Sambalpuri Cinema

References

External links 
 
 Bhukha –First Sambalpuri
 Profile of Bhukha movie
 Profile of Bhukha movie in koshalbasi.com
 Bhukha Songs

1989 films
1980s Odia-language films
Films set in Odisha
Films directed by Sabyasachi Mohapatra